Düzdaq is a small village in the municipality of Nemətabad in the Yevlakh Rayon of Azerbaijan.

References

Populated places in Yevlakh District